Katarzyna Kiedrzynek (born 19 March 1991) is a Polish professional footballer who plays as a goalkeeper for VfL Wolfsburg and the Poland national team.

Honours

Club

Paris Saint-Germain
Coupe de France Féminine: 2017–18

References

External links 

 PSG player profile
 Soccerdonna.de (in German)

1991 births
Living people
Polish women's footballers
Paris Saint-Germain Féminine players
Expatriate women's footballers in France
Polish expatriate footballers
Sportspeople from Lublin
Poland women's international footballers
Division 1 Féminine players
Polish expatriate sportspeople in France
Górnik Łęczna (women) players
Women's association football goalkeepers
VfL Wolfsburg (women) players
Expatriate women's footballers in Germany
Polish expatriate sportspeople in Germany
Frauen-Bundesliga players